Martin Brimmer (December 9, 1829 – January 14, 1896) was an American politician and first president of the Museum of Fine Arts, Boston.

Biography
Martin Brimmer was born in Boston on December 9, 1829, the son of Martin Brimmer, Mayor of Boston. He started his studies at Harvard University and graduated in 1849.  He was a member of the Massachusetts House of Representatives from 1859-1861 and the Massachusetts State Senate in 1864.  He was a presidential elector in the US election of 1876.  He also served on the Citizens' Relief Committee following the Great Boston fire of 1872.

He died in Boston on January 14, 1896.

See also
 85th Massachusetts General Court (1864)

References

External links
 

Members of the Massachusetts House of Representatives
Massachusetts state senators
1876 United States presidential electors
Museum of Fine Arts, Boston
Harvard University alumni